Stilpnus is a genus of parasitoid wasps belonging to the family Ichneumonidae.

The species of this genus are found in Europe and Northern America.

Species:
 Stilpnus adanaensis Kolarov & Beyarslan, 1994 
 Stilpnus analogus Forster, 1876

References

Ichneumonidae
Ichneumonidae genera